Cannabidiolic acid synthase (CBDA synthase) is an enzyme with systematic name cannabigerolate:oxygen oxidoreductase (cyclizing, cannabidiolate-forming). It is an oxidoreductase found in Cannabis sativa that catalyses the formation of cannabidiolate, a carboxylated precursor of cannabidiol.

Enzyme structure 

Cannabidiolic acid synthase consists of a single protein with a molecular mass of 74 kDa. Its amino acid sequence is partly (40-50%) homologous to several other oxidoreductases, such as berberine bridge enzyme in Eschscholzia californica and Nectarin V in Nicotiana langsdorffii X N. sanderae.

CBDA synthase has four binding sites; two for FAD and two for the substrate.

Enzyme function 

Cannabidiolic acid synthase catalyses the production of cannabidiolate predominantly from cannabigerolate by stereospecific oxidative cyclization of the geranyl group of cannabigerolic acid according to the following chemical reaction:

 cannabigerolate + O2 → cannabidiolate + H2O2

Cannabinerolate can also be used as a substrate, but with lower efficiency (KM=0.137 mM) than cannabigerolate (KM=0.206 mM). It covalently binds FAD, and does require coenzymes & molecular oxygen for the oxidocyclization reaction.

The optimum pH for CBDA synthase is 5.0.

References

External links 
 

EC 1.21.3